This article is the Electoral history of Sir John A. Macdonald, the first Prime Minister of Canada (1867 to 1873;  1878 to 1891).

A Conservative, he was Canada's second longest-serving Prime Minister, with two separate terms as Prime Minister (1867–1873, 1878–1891).  He won six general elections and lost one.  He died in office in 1891, three months after his sixth general election victory, and was succeeded by Sir John Abbott.

Prior to Confederation in 1867, Macdonald was a member of the Legislative Assembly of the Province of Canada and served three terms as joint Premier of the Province.

Summary

Macdonald was the second-longest serving Prime Minister, with two separate terms as Prime Minister (1867–1873, 1878–1891). He was in office for a total of 18 years, 359 days.  He led the combined Liberal-Conservative Party and Conservative Party in seven general elections, winning six and losing one.  He is in a three-way tie with Sir Wilfrid Laurier and Mackenzie King for the number of general elections he contested as leader of a party.

His streak of four consecutive majority governments (1878, 1882, 1887, and 1891) is tied with the identical record of Laurier as the longest streak of general election victories at the federal level.  His unbroken term in office from October 17, 1878 to June 6, 1891 (just under thirteen years) is the third-longest unbroken term, coming after Laurier's unbroken term in office of over fifteen years (July 11, 1896 to October 6, 1911) and King's term of just over thirteen years (October 23, 1935 to November 14, 1948.

Macdonald was the first of four prime ministers to serve non-consecutive terms, the others being Arthur Meighen, King, and Pierre Trudeau.

Macdonald was the first of five prime ministers from Ontario, the others being Alexander Mackenzie, Mackenzie Bowell, King and Lester B. Pearson.

Macdonald stood for election to the House of Commons of Canada twelve times, in 1867, 1872, 1874 (twice), 1878 (three times), 1882 (twice), 1887 (twice), and 1891, although some of those were multiple elections in the same general election, as was permitted at that time.  He won eleven of the elections and was defeated once in his home constituency of Kingston, Ontario.  Two of his elections were set aside for electoral irregularities, in one case requiring him to stand in a by-election, which he won.

Macdonald was elected as a member of the House of Commons for five different constituencies, and at various times sat in the Commons for three different constituencies in two different provinces (Kingston, Ontario; Victoria, British Columbia; and Carleton, Ontario).  He served in the Commons for a total of 23 years, 7 months, and 10 days, continuously from the first Parliament, elected in 1867, to his death in 1891.

Prior to the creation of Canada in 1867, Macdonald served seven terms (23 years) in the Legislative Assembly of the Province of Canada, as well as three terms as joint Premier of the Province.  He was also elected alderman of his home town of Kingston, Ontario, the beginning of his electoral career.

Macdonald's combined time in the Legislative Assembly of the Province of Canada, and then in the House of Commons of Canada, totalled 46 years of elected service.  His combined time as joint Premier of the Province of Canada and as Prime Minister of Canada totalled 28 years and 21 days.

Federal general elections, 1867 to 1891
Macdonald led the combined Liberal-Conservative Party and Conservative Party in seven general elections, winning six (1867, 1872, 1878, 1882, 1887 and 1891) and losing once (1874).

Federal election, 1867

Canada came into existence on July 1, 1867, when the British North America Act, 1867 was proclaimed in force.  The first general election to Parliament was held in the summer of 1867 and resulted in a majority government for Macdonald and his coalition of Conservatives and Liberal-Conservatives. The main opposition was from the Liberals, but there was also a substantial group of Anti-Confederation Members of Parliament from the province of Nova Scotia who were opposed to Confederation and sought to dissolve the new union.

1 Prime Minister when election was called;  Prime Minister after the election.
2 Party structure had not yet emerged.  George Brown of Ontario was the unofficial leader of the Liberal groupings.
3 Election returns in 1867 did not require candidates to declare party affiliation.  Large numbers of candidates did not list a party affiliation.

Federal election, 1872

The 1872 election was closely fought.  Macdonald was returned to office, albeit with a reduced majority.  An election financing scandal arose shortly after the election, with allegations that Macdonald and the Conservatives had accepted bribes in return for granting the contract for the trans-Canadian railroad to the first Canadian Pacific Railway company of Hugh Allan.  As a result of the scandal, Macdonald and his government was forced to resign in late 1873.  The Governor-General, Lord Dufferin, appointed Alexander Mackenzie, the leader of the Liberals, as Prime Minister.  Mackenzie called an election in early 1874.

1 Prime Minister when election was called;  Prime Minister after the election.
2 Party structure had not yet emerged.  Edward Blake of Ontario was the unofficial leader of the Liberal groupings.
3 Election returns in 1872 did not require candidates to declare party affiliation.  Large numbers of candidates did not list a party affiliation.

Federal election, 1874

Prime Minister Mackenzie formed his government in late 1873, after the fall of the Macdonald government in late 1873.  Mackenzie called the general election in early 1874.  He won a majority and was confirmed in office.  Macdonald retained the support of the Conservatives and became the Leader of the Opposition.  The 1874 election was the only general election Macdonald lost.

1 Prime Minister when election was called;  Prime Minister after the election.
2 Leader of the Opposition when election was called;  Leader of the Opposition after the election.
3 Election returns in 1874 did not require candidates to declare party affiliation.  Large numbers of candidates did not list a party affiliation.

Federal election, 1878

In the 1878 election, Macdonald and the Conservatives were returned to government, defeating Alexander Mackenzie and the Liberals.

1 Leader of the Opposition when election was called;  Prime Minister after the election.
2 Prime Minister when election was called;  Leader of the Opposition after the election.
3 Election returns in 1878 did not require candidates to declare party affiliation.  Large numbers of candidates did not list a party affiliation.

Federal election, 1882

Macdonald and the Conservatives were maintained in power by the 1882 election.  Macdonald won his fourth majority government, defeating the Liberals, now led by Edward Blake.

1 Prime Minister when election was called;  Prime Minister after the election.
2 Leader of the Opposition when election was called;  Leader of the Opposition after the election.
3 Election returns in 1882 did not require candidates to declare party affiliation.  Large numbers of candidates did not list a party affiliation.

Federal election, 1887

Macdonald and the Conservatives were maintained in power by the 1887 election.  Macdonald won his fifth majority government, defeating the Liberals, again led by Edward Blake.  One notable feature of the election was the drop in Quebec seats held by the Conservatives, following the execution of Louis Riel two years earlier.

1 Prime Minister when election was called;  Prime Minister after the election.
2 Leader of the Opposition when election was called;  Leader of the Opposition after the election.
3 Election returns in 1887 did not require candidates to declare party affiliation.  Many candidates did not list a party affiliation.

Federal election, 1891

The 1891 election was Macdonald's last.  Macdonald, aged 76, again led the Conservatives to victory, his sixth, albeit with a reduced majority.  His opponent in the 1891 election was Wilfrid Laurier, the new leader of the Liberals.  Macdonald died three months after the election.

1 Prime Minister when election was called;  Prime Minister after the election.
2 Leader of the Opposition when election was called;  Leader of the Opposition after the election.
3 Acclaimed.
4 Election returns in 1887 did not require candidates to declare party affiliation.  Many candidates did not list a party affiliation.

Federal constituency elections, 1867 to 1891
Macdonald stood for election to the House of Commons twelve times, in three different provinces (British Columbia, Manitoba and Ontario), in five different ridings.  He was elected eleven times and defeated once.

1867 Federal election:  Kingston

 Elected.

1872 Federal election:  Kingston

 Elected. 
X Incumbent.

1874  Federal election:  Kingston

 Elected. 
X Incumbent.

1874 Federal by-election:  Kingston
On Macdonald's election being declared void, November 21, 1874

 Elected. 
X Incumbent.

1878 Federal election:  Kingston
Macdonald stood for election in three different constituencies at the 1878 general election, as was permitted at that time:  Kingston, Ontario;  Victoria, British Columbia; and Marquette, Manitoba.  He was elected in Victoria and Marquette but was defeated in Kingston, his only loss at the constituency level.  Macdonald chose to sit as the Member of Parliament from Victoria.

 Elected. 
X Incumbent.
1 Rounding error.

1878 Federal election:  Victoria
Macdonald stood for election in three different constituencies at the 1878 general election, as was permitted at that time:  Victoria, British Columbia; Kingston, Ontario; and Marquette, Manitoba.  He was elected in Victoria and Marquette but was defeated in Kingston, his only loss at the constituency level.  Macdonald chose to sit as the Member of Parliament from Victoria.

 Elected (two member constituency).
X Incumbent.

1878 Federal election:  Marquette
Macdonald stood for election in three different constituencies at the 1878 general election, as was permitted at that time:  Marquette, Manitoba; Kingston, Ontario;  and Victoria, British Columbia.  He was elected in Victoria and Marquette but was defeated in Kingston, his only loss at the constituency level.  Macdonald chose to sit as the Member of Parliament from Victoria.

 Elected.

1882 Federal election:  Carleton
Macdonald stood for election in two different constituencies at the 1882 general election, as was permitted at that time:  Carleton, Ontario and Lennox, Ontario.  He was elected in both ridings but chose to sit as the Member of Parliament for Carleton.  His election in Lennox was subsequently set aside for election irregularities.

1882 Federal election:  Lennox
Macdonald stood for election in two different constituencies at the 1882 general election, as was permitted at that time:  Lennox, Ontario, and Carleton.  He was elected in both ridings but chose to sit as the Member of Parliament for Carleton.  His election in Lennox was subsequently set aside for election irregularities.

 Elected.

1887 Federal election:  Kingston
Macdonald stood for election in two different constituencies at the 1887 general election, as was permitted at that time:  Kingston, Ontario and Lennox, Ontario.  He was elected in both ridings but chose to sit as the Member of Parliament for Kingston.

 Elected. 
X Incumbent.

1887 Federal election:  Carleton

Macdonald stood for election in two different constituencies at the 1887 general election, as was permitted at that time:  Lennox, Ontario and Kingston, Ontario.  He was elected in both ridings but chose to sit as the Member of Parliament for Kingston.

 Elected. 
X Incumbent.

1891 Federal election:  Kingston
Macdonald stood for election in Kingston, Ontario and was re-elected.  It was his last election.  He died three months after the election.

 Elected. 
X Incumbent.

Province of Canada general elections, 1844-1867 
 Macdonald was elected to the Legislative Assembly of the Province of Canada seven times, in the provincial general elections of 1844, 1848, 1852, 1854, 1858, 1861 and 1863, for a total of 23 years in the Legislative Assembly.  Throughout this period, he represented the riding of Kingston, Canada West, initially as a Conservative (1844-1858), and then as a Liberal-Conservative (1858-1867).

Macdonald served three terms as joint Premier for the Province of Canada:  1856-1858;  1858-1862;  and 1864-1867.  He was the longest-serving joint Premier, with a total time in office of 9 years and 27 days.

Municipal election:  Kingston, 1843
Macdonald was elected once as alderman for the Town of Kingston.

 Elected.

See also 

 Electoral history of Alexander Mackenzie - Macdonald's successor as Prime Minister in 1873, and in turn defeated by Macdonald in 1878.
 Electoral history of John Abbott - Macdonald's successor as leader of the Conservative Party, and as Prime Minister.

References

External links 
 History of Federal Ridings since 1867

Macdonald, John A.